Kazmaier is a surname.  Notable people with the name Kazmaier include:

 Bill Kazmaier, champion powerlifter, strongman, and wrestler
 Dick Kazmaier, American football player and winner of the 1951 Heisman Trophy
 Linn Kazmaier (born 2006), German biathlete
 Patty Kazmaier-Sandt, American ice hockey player

See also
 Patty Kazmaier Award, award for the top American female college ice hockey player, named for Patty Kazmaier-Sandt